Depressigyra globulus is a species of sea snail and a marine gastropod mollusk in the family Peltospiridae.

Description

Distribution

References

External links

Peltospiridae
Gastropods described in 1989